The palatomaxillary suture is a suture separating the maxilla from the palatine bone.

Additional images

Bones of the head and neck